Adam Krzyzak is a computer engineer from Concordia University in Montreal, Quebec. He was named a Fellow of the Institute of Electrical and Electronics Engineers (IEEE) in 2012 for his contributions to nonparametric algorithms and classification systems for machine learning.

References 

Academic staff of Concordia University
Canadian engineers
Polish engineers
Fellow Members of the IEEE
Living people
Year of birth missing (living people)